Lo Tsai-jen is a Taiwanese businessman, the chairman and general manager of Cheng Shin Rubber, founded by his father Luo Jye.

Lo is the second son of Luo Jye. He earned a bachelor's degree from the Newark College of Engineering.

In June 2014, Lo succeeded his father Luo Jye as chairman of Cheng Shin Rubber, having been vice-chairman since 2010, and general manager before that.

References

Living people
21st-century Taiwanese businesspeople
New Jersey Institute of Technology alumni
Taiwanese chairpersons of corporations
Year of birth missing (living people)